Connecticut's 91st House of Representatives district elects one member of the Connecticut House of Representatives. It encompasses parts of Hamden and has been represented by Democrat Mike D'Agostino since 2013.

Recent elections

2020

2018

2016

2014

2012

References

91